T in the park 2001 was a music festival held in Balado, Scotland. It took place on 7 and 8 July 2001, with approximately 50,000 people attending. The event was held despite the ongoing foot and mouth outbreak, unlike a number of other festivals at the time.

Stereophonics headlined the main stage on 7 July, while Texas were the headline act on the Sunday.

Main stage

NME Stage

Slam Tent

King Tut's Tent

Links

References

T in the Park
2001 in Scotland
2001 in British music
July 2001 events in the United Kingdom
2001 music festivals